Perfectae Caritatis, the Decree on the Adaptation and Renewal of Religious Life, is the document issued by the Second Vatican Council which deals specifically with institutes of consecrated life in the Roman Catholic Church.  One of the shorter documents of the Council, the decree was approved by a vote of 2,321 to 4 of the assembled bishops, and promulgated by Pope Paul VI on 28 October 1965.  As is customary for Church documents, the title is taken from the first words (incipit) of the decree: "of Perfect Charity" in Latin.

Content
The Second Vatican Council had already given an exposition of the nature of religious life in chapter 6 of the Constitution Lumen gentium and Perfectae Caritatis reflected the principles of religious life as established therein. This chapter described the essential form of religious life as a life "consecrated by the profession of the evangelical counsels" (n. 44). The Decree Perfectae Caritatis was published in order to, "treat of the life and discipline of those institutes whose members make profession of chastity, poverty and obedience and to provide for their needs in our time" (Perfectae Caritatis n. 1).
Containing 25 numbered paragraphs, the Decree established five general principles to guide the renewal of these institutes. Because of the broad variety of religious communities with their different histories, characteristics, customs, and missions, the Vatican Council did not give specific indications, and left to each individual community the authority to determine what needed to be changed in accord with the spirit of their founders, the needs of modern life, and the situations where they lived and worked.

Aftermath
On August 6, 1966 Pope Paul VI issued Ecclesiae Sanctae, an apostolic letter on the implementation of certain conciliar documents, including Perfectae Caritatis.

The period that followed the promulgation of Perfectae Caritatis was marked by a huge amount of experimentation in religious life. Many institutes replaced their traditional habits with more modern attire, experimented with different forms of prayer and community life, and adapted obedience to a superior to a form of consultation and discussion. A great number of religious left religious life entirely, and in subsequent decades there was a large drop the number of religious vocations in the Western World. It is not clear how much of this change was due to the documents of the Second Vatican Council. Historians note that western society as a whole was going through social turmoil caused by the sexual revolution.

External links
 The full text in English is available from the Holy See's website

References

Documents of the Second Vatican Council
1965 documents
1965 in Christianity